French football club SEC Bastia's 1965–66 season. Finished fourth place in league and thus qualified to play French Division 1 play-off for promotion. Play-off matches took two wins and two defeats, and was unable rise in Division 1. Coupe de France "last 32" round was eliminated in the defeated 1–0 in Ajaccio.

Transfers

In

Out

Squad

French Division 2

League table

Fixroundes & results 
Note: 13. and 31. weeks did not match.

Play-off the promotion French Division 1

Coupe de France

External links 
 All information for the season - Corse Football 

SC Bastia seasons
Bastia